Kri (Krìì) is a recently described Vietic language. It is the native language of the Kri people in Laos. Kri speakers live in the Upper Ñrong (Nam Noy) valley of Khammouane Province, Laos, as well as other locations within the Nakai-Nam Theun Biodiversity Conservation Area. It is mutually intelligible with Pròòngq, which is spoken in several villages downstream from the Kri (Enfield & Diffloth 2009).

The Kri call themselves mleeng Kri, and their language meengq Kri. They are swidden cultivators who move every 2–3 years among pre-existing village sites (Chamberlain 1998). Houses are torn down after the death of a household member, and the housing materials are then used to construct a new house in a different location. Other than the Kri language, many adults, especially men, are also fluent in Vietnamese, Saek, Bru, and Lao.

Phonology

Consonants 
The consonants in Kri are:

Finals 
These are the consonants that may come at the end of a syllable in Kri:

Do note that they are all contrastive, and that vowels, nasal consonants, and oral consonants may have checked endings. The Oral endings also may become voiceless.

Morphology
Kri has a few morphological features, less than Khmu but more than Vietnamese.

Causative Infix 
The -a- infix may be inserted into words with two initial consonants, between them. This infix turns intransitive verb into a transitive verb, adding an agent. It can also turn a noun into a verb. Here are some examples:

praang - to cross over
paraang - to take someone across

slôôj - to be washed away by running water
salôôj - to discard into flowing water, to let something be washed away

kleeh - to fall off
kaleeh - to pick off

blang - of the eyes, to become open (like a young dog's)
balang - to open one's eyes

ckaang - a hand span
cakaang - to measure something by hand spans

Nominalising Infix 
The -rn- infix is placed after a single initial consonant. This infix makes a noun from a verb:

sat - to get one's foot stuck
srnat - a foothold

koq - to live
krnoq - a house

This shortens to -r- when between consonants:

kadôôlq - to rest the head on something
krdôôlq - a pillow

Verbal Morphology 
There are three forms of negation: dêêh, laa, and cùù. There have distinct syntactic behavior. Cùù occurs before the subject (e.g. sentence initially). Both dêêh and laa can occur before the verb (after the subject). Dêêh is distinct from laa in that dêêh can occur in responsive ellipsis environments (i.e. as a stand alone word after a questions).

There are a variety of TAM markers (which supply information about the tense, aspect, or mood) of predicates.

Syntax 
The basic word order of Kri is SVO, although argument ellipsis and fronting of constituents is common. Further, there is no case marking or cross-referencing agreement.

Verbal Domain 
Serial verb constructions have an explicit marker of subordination (kùù).

Nominal Domain 
Kri pronouns displays sensitivity to the three grammatical numbers in Kri (singular, dual and plural), as well inclusive/exclusive distinction, and (for the singular) a polite/bare distinctions. A gender distinction is made only in the third person polite forms. Polite forms are used when there is appropriate social distance (e.g. by age or kinship).

Classifiers 
The classifier longq can be (but need not be) used to express possession. There are also numeral classifier constructions. These can be ordered Number-Classifier-Noun or Noun-Number-Classifier.

References

Further reading

External links
http://sealsxxii.vjf.cnrs.fr/Documents/Abstract-Enfield.pdf

Severely endangered languages
Vietic languages